Peripatopsis intermedia is a species of velvet worm in the Peripatopsidae family. This species is about 33 mm long and has 19 pairs of legs: 18 pregenital leg pairs plus a last pair of much reduced legs. The type locality is in South Africa. Although some authorities doubt the validity of this species and deem it to be a junior synonym of P. balfouri, others consider these two to be separate species, citing the distance (168 km) between their type localities.

References

Endemic fauna of South Africa
Onychophorans of temperate Africa
Onychophoran species
Animals described in 1928